CTAS may refer to:

Medicine
Canadian Triage and Acuity Scale
Compulsive Tool Acquisition Syndrome, also known as Gear Acquisition Syndrome

Business
Cintas

Computers
Data Definition Language: Create Table as Select